"I'm in Control" is a song by English electronic music duo AlunaGeorge, featuring Jamaican dancehall singer Popcaan. It was released on 21 January 2016 as the lead single from AlunaGeorge's second studio album, I Remember (2016). The song peaked at number 39 on the UK Singles Chart.

Music video
The music video for the song was released to YouTube on 10 February 2016. The video is directed by Emil Nava.

Track listings

Charts

Weekly charts

Year-end charts

Certifications

References

2016 singles
2016 songs
AlunaGeorge songs
Island Records singles
Popcaan songs
Songs written by Romans (musician)
British dancehall songs
Song recordings produced by Mark Ralph (record producer)